Nathan Michener House is a historic home located in South Coventry Township, Chester County, Pennsylvania.  It was built about 1813, and is a -story, four-bay by two-bay, fieldstone dwelling a transitional Greek Revival style.  It has a gable roof, end chimneys, and features massive corner quoins.  It also has a one-story, fieldstone sunporch with a pyramidal roof.

The house was added to the National Register of Historic Places in 1976.

References

Houses on the National Register of Historic Places in Pennsylvania
Greek Revival houses in Pennsylvania
Houses completed in 1813
Houses in Chester County, Pennsylvania
National Register of Historic Places in Chester County, Pennsylvania